The Oleh Blokhin Club is a list of Ukrainian football players that have scored 100 or more goals during their professional careers in top Ukrainian league, cup, European club competitions, national team and foreign leagues. This club is named after first Ukrainian player to score 100 goals, Oleh Blokhin.

Qualifying goals 

Traditionally, counted goals scored in the following matches:

 UL - goals scored in top leagues of Ukrainian football competitions.
 UC - goals in Ukrainian Cup and Supercup scored in the stages where top league teams participate.
 EC - goals scored in European Champion Clubs Cup, UEFA Champions League, UEFA Cup, Cup Winners Cup and Intertoto Cup for both home and foreign clubs.
 NT - goals scored for national and olympic teams of Ukraine, USSR, CIS in the official matches.
 SL - goals scored in top leagues of Soviet football competitions..
 SC - goals in Soviet Cup and Supercup scored in the stages where top league teams participate.
 FL - goals scored in top leagues of foreign football competitions: Argentina, Austria, Belgium, Brasil, Czech Republic, England, France, Germany, Greece, Italy, Mexico, Netherlands, Portugal, Russia, Serbia, Scotland, Sweden, Spain, Switzerland, Turkey, United States
 FC - goals in foreign Cup and Supercup scored in the stages where top league teams participate: Argentina, Austria, Belgium, Brasil, Czech Republic, England, France, Germany, Greece, Italy, Mexico, Netherlands, Portugal, Russia, Serbia, Scotland, Sweden, Spain, Switzerland, Turkey, United States

Oleh Blokhin Club

Players still playing are shown in bold.

Candidates 
These players may become members of Oleh Blokhin club soon.
 Oleksandr Kovpak - 88 goals
 Oleksandr Pyschur - 84 goals
 Serhiy Kuznetsov - 77 goals

Active players are shown in bold.

References 

  All-time Ukrainian scorers

See also
Serhiy Rebrov club
Timerlan Huseinov club

Ukrainian football trophies and awards
Lists of association football players